Prasanna Kumar Patasani (born 27 April 1946) is an Indian lawyer, philosopher, poet, and former member of Lok Sabha, the lower house of the Indian Parliament. He represented the Bhubaneswar constituency of Odisha from 1998 to 2019. He's elected as a Member of Parliament for five terms.He is the senior vice president and founder member of the Biju Janata Dal. Currently he's working as a Member of State Panning Board, Government of Odisha with a Cabinet Minister Status

Early life 
Patsani joined the Maharishi Mahesh yogi ashram at Rishikesh and went through yoga ashanas trainings. He went to Switzerland to join the ashram of Maharishi Mahesh Yogi's Ashram. In Switzerland he was the student of Maharishi Mahesh Yogi with Ravi Sankar. With the team of Maharishi Mahesh Yogi he travelled extensively worldwide and about one hundred countries. Around 1980's he returned to India and was the founder President of Maharishi College of Natural Law in Bhubaneswar, the state capital of Orissa. There after he actively took part and open around hundreds of institutions, out of which 20-30 institutions are in the name of  Patasani and he is the founder father of various educational institutions in the state of Orissa. In 1980s the people of the eastern region used to travel towards the southern states for higher and technical educations, where after upon the active leadership of Prasanna Patasani not only the state of Orissa became the hub of the technical education in the state but also in the entire eastern region Orissa became the hub for the technical education behind almost all the institutions,  Prasanna Patasani has played the major role for establishment of such institutions. Apart from the educational institutions,  Prasanna Patasani has written many a Books and poems and Film songs besides acting in various movies and songs which were well acclaimed not only in the state of Orissa but also spread worldwide.

Prasanna Patasani has been elected for the eighth time (four times as Member of Legislative Assembly and four times as the Member of Parliament from Bhubaneswar the state capital of Orissa). He is a great follower of Shri Biju Patnaik.

Patasani has published 60 books, in different languages, and has written about 100 articles. He has spoken in Japan, US, and UK at Oxford University on "the future of human civilization". He had gone underground for about 12 years to save him from imprisonment on the alleged involvement with the Maoist and their cause. During the period of his underground he joined his guru, Maharishi Mahesh Yogi, who taught him the Patanjali Yoga Sutra, which changed his life. He still carries the "blessing wand" his guru gave him.

See also
 Indian general election, 2014 (Odisha)
 Indian general election, 2009 (Odisha)

References

External links
 Members of Fourteenth Lok Sabha - Parliament of India website

1946 births
Living people
Lok Sabha members from Odisha
India MPs 1998–1999
India MPs 1999–2004
India MPs 2004–2009
India MPs 2009–2014
India MPs 2014–2019
Biju Janata Dal politicians
People from Khordha district
Politicians from Bhubaneswar
Indian male poets
Poets from Odisha
Odia-language poets
Recipients of the Odisha Sahitya Akademi Award
20th-century Indian poets
21st-century Indian poets